Pickering Beach is an unincorporated community in Kent County, Delaware, United States. Pickering Beach is located along the Delaware Bay at the end of Pickering Beach Road, southeast of Dover. The beach itself is an established horseshoe crab sanctuary, with the crabs spawning there in early summer.

References

Unincorporated communities in Kent County, Delaware
Unincorporated communities in Delaware